John Hodgetts Hodgetts-Foley (17 July 1797 – 13 November 1861), born John Hodgetts Foley, of Prestwood House (then in Kingswinford, and now in Kinver) in Staffordshire was a British MP.

He was the second son of the Hon. Edward Foley of Stoke Edith, Herefordshire and his wife Eliza Maria Foley Hodgetts.  He inherited the Prestwood estate from his mother, whose mother Eliza Foley was a descendant of Philip Foley.

He represented the borough of Droitwich in Parliament from 1822 to 1835 as a Whig and East Worcestershire from 1847 to 1861 (initially as a Whig and from 1859 as a Liberal).

He married Charlotte Margaret Gage, daughter of John Gage and Mary Milbanke and granddaughter of General Thomas Gage and Margaret Kemble, on 20 October 1825. Their son was Henry John Wentworth Hodgetts-Foley

References

External links 
 

1797 births
1861 deaths
Whig (British political party) MPs for English constituencies
Members of the Parliament of the United Kingdom for Droitwich
UK MPs 1820–1826
UK MPs 1826–1830
UK MPs 1830–1831
UK MPs 1831–1832
UK MPs 1832–1835
UK MPs 1847–1852
UK MPs 1852–1857
UK MPs 1857–1859
UK MPs 1859–1865
People from Kinver
John
Liberal Party (UK) MPs for English constituencies